Leonard Arthur Kitz QC (April 9, 1916 – January 30, 2006) was the first Jewish mayor of Halifax, Nova Scotia (1955–1957).

Born in Halifax, Nova Scotia, to Harry and Yetta (Lesser) Kitz, he grew up with older sister Hildred Kitz (Silver) and younger brother Joe. He attended Halifax's Protestant school system (there being no state-supported school for non-Christians) and graduated from the Halifax Academy. He attended Dalhousie University, where he studied law, graduating from Dalhousie Law School in 1938.

With World War II breaking out in Europe in 1939, Kitz joined the Canadian Army becoming an infantry officer in the Princess Louise Fusiliers. During the war, he served in Italy and Holland. After the war he served as a lawyer in military tribunals.

While serving in England in 1945, Kitz met and married Dr. Alice Duff Findlay. The two returned to Halifax after the war where Kitz opened his own law firm, located on Granville Street. His law firm was eventually joined by Robert Matheson becoming Matheson and Kitz. Kitz served as President of the Nova Scotia Barristers' Society from 1968 to 1969.

In 1948, Kitz decided to enter politics and he was elected an alderman in Halifax. He served as an alderman from 1948 to 1955. Kitz is most remembered for his part as the 'driving force' behind the funding and construction of a statue of Winston Churchill which is a landmark on Halifax's Spring Garden Road.

Kitz was re-elected in 1956, but two years later, he resigned the mayorship to run, unsuccessfully, as a Liberal for parliament in the federal riding of Halifax. He was one of the founders of the city's most prestigious independent school, The Halifax Grammar School, opened in 1958.

Kitz' first wife died in 1969. He remarried in 1971 to Janet (née Brownlee) Kitz who became a noted historian of the Halifax Explosion and the author of a number of books on the subject. The couple played an important leadership role in organizing public commemorations of the explosion.

References

 Tribute at the Nova Scotia Barristers' Society by Daniel N. Paul

1916 births
2006 deaths
Mayors of Halifax, Nova Scotia
Schulich School of Law alumni
Jewish mayors of places in Canada
Jewish Canadian politicians